Dav (based on the initials of the first names of: Daniel Okáli, Andrej Sirácky and Vladimír Clementis) was a leftist journal published between 1924 and 1937 with intervals in Prague and then in Bratislava by the group Davisti. The journal featured illustrations by Frans Masereel, George Grosz, Marc Chagall and others. It had a Marxist stance. A reprint edition came out in 1965. 

DAV included important Slovak writers, poets and cultural workers, scientists and philosophers, politicians and lawyers, literary critics and graphic designers and visual artists like Ladislav Novomeský, Ján Poničan, Peter Jilemnický, Andrej Bagar, Jozef Tomášik-Dumín, Jarko Elen, Fraňo Kráľ, Andrej Siracký, Ladislav Szántó, Gustáv Husák, Vladimir Clementis, Eduard Urx, Daniel Okáli, Alexander Matuška, Ľudovít Fulla, Mikuláš Galanda and others. Revue was also a mediator of books by socialist writers (especially poets) like Ján Rob Poničan (Som, Dva svety), Jiří Wolker (Večer, Sborník proletárskych básní), Laco Novomeský (Nedeľa) and others.  The DAV mediated translations of world literature and reviews of works by authors such as H. Barbusse, T. Mann, G. B. Shaw, F. Nansen, J. London, U. Sinclair, and others. Czech writers such as Marie Majerová, Zdeněk Nejedlý, Julius Fučík, Ivan Olbracht, Ivan Sekanina and even the Russian writer Ilya Ehrenburg have also published in DAV. After the outbreak of the economic crisis in the 1930s, the authors of the DAV mediated demonstrations, protests and all popular actions against the government in order to point out the contradictions of interwar Czechoslovakia. 

The concept of DAV magazine connected the political line on the one hand, and the avant-garde aesthetic line on the other hand. DAV supported internationalism on the one hand, and too equality between Slovaks and Czechs (in the first period they stood in radical opposition to conservatism; later they found their own concept of national continuity with the social progressive movements of the past). The DAV actively reflected on the tragic events in Košúty (May 1931), where protesters were shot and killed during a workers' strike. DAV dedicated to this event the all issue of the journal and organized the Manifesto of Slovak Writers (they were also signed by E. B. Lukáč, J. G. Tajovský, M. Urban, J. Smrek and G. Vámoš). Clementis wrote letters to important writers like Romain Rolland and Maxim Gorky). DAV members also wrote about the conflicts in Polomka or about the killing of a worker on the construction of the Červená Skala - Margecany railway.

The DAV played an important role in shaping 1. philosophical and political ideas in Slovakia; 2. Slovak left-wing politics and 3. in establishing modernist tendencies in Slovak visual art and literature.

Reflection 

The creative reflection of the DAV intellectual group was devoted to authors who also participated in their rehabilitation in the 1960s. From the historical-political point of view it was mainly Viliam Plevza and Štefan Drug and from more the aesthetic, culturological and literary point of view Karol Rosenbaum. 

In the 21st century, M. Habaj , K. Csiba , P. Kerecman , D. Hajko, J. Lysý, J. Leikert, L. Perný, M. Krno, M. Gešper, E. Chmelár,  J. Migašová , J. Baer  and others devoted their texts to the reflection of DAV. 
In 1992, the last collection of Ladislav Novomeský's texts from 1960s entitled "Repayment of the Great Debt" was published in the V. Clementis Foundation. . In 2015, L. Perný organized a conference for the 110th anniversary of the birth of Ladislav Novomeský in Bratislava . In 2002 , 2012  and 2022, three conferences about Vladimir Clementis were organized in Bratislava. In 2022, Matica slovenská and ASA Institute organized a conference for Vladimír Clementis (the 120th anniversary) and Vladimír Mináč (the 120th anniversary)  and in 2023 for Daniel Okáli (the 120th anniversary) .

Aesthetic Aspects 
According to Lukáš Perný, the author of the cover of the DAV revue was Mikuláš Galanda (with the alias La Ganda), who, together with Ľ. Fulla created the artistic identity of the DAV revue. They collaborated with DAV members through books, posters, and bulletins; for example, Fulla illustrated a book by Ján Rob Poničan before the formation of the DAV and Galanda created drawings for Novomeský’s debut poetry book. The Revue also  contains  the  first  Slovak  attempt  at modernist  typography,  the equivalent of which  can be found in  the Czech avant-garde (Host, Pásmo). 

According to Lukáš Perný, when  discussing  the  aesthetic  component  (visual  dimension  of  the  DAV  revue design), the international  context that connects it must not be overlooked:
 1. The  influence  between  Prague  and  Slovakia-Bratislava;  with  Hungary  (texts  of avant-garde theorist and poet Lajos Kassák published in DAV) (The DAV was part of the manifestations of Slovak modernism, which was  closely connected with Prague),
 2. Feedback with  French  culture  (paintings  by  Frans Masereel  in  the  first  issue  of DAV; controversy with French poetry),
 3. with Russian avantgarde (Okali’s  appeal to Mayakovsky in  the DAV 1924;  men-tions of Mejerchold, Mayakovsky, Erenburg in DAV 1925/1),4.with German avantgarde (especially art of the New Objectivity – aesthetics of experience with urban culture in the form of satirical and social-critical images based on aestheticization  of  visuality of –bourgeois entertainment,  nightlife,  social  periphery and  poverty,  prostitution, murders,  political  criticism (paintings  by  Otto Dix, Georg Grosz – published in DAV revue). 

According to Lukáš Perný, D. Okáli’s text – with the motto “Not an artistic program! An artistic act!”–represents a pamphlet article of the DAV on social-revolutionary art. Ideologically, (D. Okáli) finds the function  of  art  and  culture  in  the  revolutionary  rebirth  of  society,  a radical  split  with tradition  (criticism  of  bourgeois  ideology,  clericalism,  capitalism,  and  individualism), referring to Trotsky (art as a means of changing the economic establishment and helping to achieve political  power). 
Collectivism of DAV — according  to J. Migašová — is  based  on  reflections  on  collective  art  by  Lajos  Kassák,  and  also  under  the influence  of  Jiří Wolker,  Karel Teige  (Teige  redefined  the  concept  of  folk  art)  and  early Devětstil.

References

Defunct magazines published in Slovakia
Defunct political magazines
Magazines established in 1924
Magazines disestablished in 1937
Mass media in Bratislava
Magazines published in Prague
Magazines published in Slovakia
Marxist magazines
Defunct magazines published in Czechoslovakia